Stapeley Hill is a sacred saddleback shaped hill in South-West Shropshire, near the village of Priestweston, not far from another landmark, Corndon Hill.

The Hill is home to Mitchell's Fold  and along the path leading from the Fold which crosses Stapeley Common, home to the Cow Stone , or single standing Stone - Menhir and the Stapeley Hill Ring Cairn  . There are two Bronze Age cairns at or near the summit, and such round cairns are a common feature of Welsh mountain summits.

Notable Resident
Victoria Cross recipient John Doogan farmed here between 1926 and 1937.

References

Ruins in Shropshire
Tourist attractions in Shropshire
Archaeological sites in Shropshire
Stone Age sites in England
Hills of Shropshire